Chajakhu (also Romanized as Chājākhū; also known as Chāchākhū, Chachakhoo, Chā Chā Khow, Chāh Akhur, and Chāh Ākhvor) is a village in Momenabad Rural District, in the Central District of Sarbisheh County, South Khorasan Province, Iran. At the 2006 census, its population was 44, in 14 families.

References 

Populated places in Sarbisheh County